Pickens High School is a public high school in Jasper, Georgia, United States.  It serves the communities of Jasper, Nelson, Talking Rock, and Tate.

The school serves grades 9–12.

Notable alumni
Chandler Smith (Class of 2020), NASCAR driver

External links 
 http://pickenshigh.pickens.k12.ga.us/
 

Public high schools in Georgia (U.S. state)
Education in Pickens County, Georgia